La casa del mar is a 2015 Argentine television series created and directed by Juan Pablo Laplace. Co-produced by Cisne Films, founded by Laplace and Rocío Scenna, the series was nominated for an International Emmy for Best Drama, and five Tato Awards including best fiction program, actress and cinematography.

Cast 
Gloria Carrá ... (4 episodes, 2015)
Federico D'Elía ... (4 episodes, 2015)
Darío Grandinetti ... (4 episodes, 2015)
Juan Gil Navarro ... (4 episodes, 2015)
Antonio Birabent ... (3 episodes, 2015)
Delfina Chaves ... (3 episodes, 2015)
Tomás Fonzi ... (3 episodes, 2015)
Agustin Pardella ... (3 episodes, 2015)
Salo Pasik	... (3 episodes, 2015)
Micaela Vázquez ... (3 episodes, 2015)

Awards

References

External links 

2010s Argentine television series
Argentine drama television series
2015 Argentine television series debuts
2015 Argentine television series endings